Rhoenanthus coreanus is a species of hacklegill mayfly in the family Potamanthidae.

References

Mayflies
Articles created by Qbugbot
Insects described in 1985